If You Don't Mask, You Don't Get was a mural created by Banksy in 2020. The artwork, inspired by the ongoing COVID-19 pandemic, was removed due to Transport for London's anti-graffiti policy.

Background
Banksy posed as a cleaner in order to paint the mural inside a London Underground carriage. The title is thought to be a play on words for the saying "If you don't ask, you don't get." Other slogans linked to the UK band Chumbawamba were used in the mural.

References

2020 works
Media depictions of the COVID-19 pandemic in the United Kingdom
Mammals in art
Works about the COVID-19 pandemic
Works by Banksy
History of the London Underground